Jean Taisner (or Taisnier) (Latin: Johannes Taisnerius; 1508, Ath, Habsburg Netherlands – 1562, Cologne) was a musician, astrologer, and self-styled mathematician who published a number of works.

A publication of his entitled Opusculum perpetua memoria dignissimum, de natura magnetis et ejus effectibus, Item de motu continuo  is considered a piece of plagiarism, as Taisner presents, as though his own, the Epistola de magnete of Peter of Maricourt and a treatise on the fall of bodies by Gianbattista Benedetti. The work describes a magnetic-based perpetual motion machine consisting of a ramp, a magnet stone and an iron ball.  Peter of Maricourt had earlier noted such a system which made use of the strength of the magnet stone. This runs into trouble because the path integral of force on a closed loop in a magnetic field is zero (see History of perpetual motion machines).

Sources 
Catholic Encyclopedia: Pierre de Maricourt

Roman Catholic priests of the Habsburg Netherlands
16th-century Latin-language writers
People involved in plagiarism controversies